African-American astronauts are Americans of African descent who have either traveled into space or been part of an astronaut program.

African-American astronauts

Traveled into space

Never traveled into space

Often cited as the first African-American astronaut candidate

See also 

Arnaldo Tamayo Méndez, first person of African descent and first Afro-Latino to fly in space.

References 

Black
Astronauts